The barred straw (Eulithis pyraliata) is a moth of the family Geometridae. The species was first described by Michael Denis and Ignaz Schiffermüller in 1775. It is sometimes placed in the genus Gandaritis. It is found throughout the Palearctic region, including Britain and Ireland, and also the Near East.

The wingspan is 33–38 mm. The forewings are bright yellow with two narrow brown fascia. The hindwings are cream coloured but are rarely seen due to the characteristic resting position (see spinach moth).The larva is naked, green with two narrow white dorsal stripes.

The species flies at night from June to August  and is attracted to light.

The larva feeds on bedstraw. The species overwinters as an egg.

  The flight season refers to the British Isles. This may vary in other parts of the range.

References 
Chinery, Michael Collins Guide to the Insects of Britain and Western Europe 1986 (Reprinted 1991)
Skinner, Bernard Colour Identification Guide to Moths of the British Isles 1984

External links

"70.093 BF1758 Barred Straw Gandaritis pyraliata ([Denis & Schiffermüller], 1775)". UKmoths. Retrieved 25 April 2019.
"08335 Gandaritis pyraliata ([Denis & Schiffermüller], 1775) - Schwefelgelber Haarbüschelspanner". Lepiforum e.V. Retrieved 25 April 2019.

Cidariini
Moths described in 1775
Moths of Europe
Taxa named by Michael Denis
Taxa named by Ignaz Schiffermüller